Copiula oxyrhina is a species of frog in the family Microhylidae.
It is endemic to Papua New Guinea.
Its natural habitats are subtropical or tropical moist lowland forests, subtropical or tropical moist montane forests, subtropical or tropical seasonally wet or flooded lowland grassland, rural gardens, urban areas, and heavily degraded former forest.

References

Copiula
Amphibians of Papua New Guinea
Taxonomy articles created by Polbot
Amphibians described in 1898